Koi Kei Bakery is a chain of food souvenir shops based in Macau. The bakery is most famous for its peanut brittle and almond biscuits, but also sells beef jerky, ginger candy, egg rolls, and other pastries and snack products. It has a 74.4% share of the pastry souvenir market in Macau. Koi Kei currently operates 21 stores in Macau, and operates branches in Hong Kong and Singapore.

History 

Koi Kei was founded by Leoung Chan-Kuong, an immigrant from Foshan, China, who initially started selling peanut brittle and ginger candy on a pushcart in Macau.  Leoung's new business did not receive much support from his family, so he had to resort to selling his apartment and borrowing from friends to collect the  required to start the business.  In 1997, he purchased and opened Koi Kei's first store. Leoung frequently crossed paths with triad gangsters, who sought to eliminate industry competition by setting fire to his shop. The company began distributing internationally in 2004.

Advertising 
In 2007, Hong Kong food critic Chua Lam filmed an advertisement for Koi Kei in Macau. He was filmed holding an almond biscuit, taking a bite, and saying: "Koi Kei almond biscuit, when eaten it has a biscuit flavour. The ad triggered a viral response online, causing the phrase "when eaten it has a biscuit flavour" to become synonymous with the Koi Kei brand.

Sponsorships 
Since 2010, Koi Kei has sponsored many TVB productions such as Gun Metal Grey and Lord of Shanghai. The 2013 TVB drama Brother's Keeper is based on the story of Koi Kei bakery. Edwin Siu was cast as a character based on Leong Chan-Kuong, the company's founder, and Kristal Tin was cast as Koi Kei's general manager. Edwin Siu has since become a brand ambassador for Koi Kei.

Mainland China trademark issues 
In recent years there have been many cases where the Koi Kei trademark was being fraudulently used in Mainland China and other places. Koi Kei has since brought the issue to the Chinese courts. Although the company has been to China for many exhibitions, the company has not expanded into Mainland China. These issues were depicted in the 28th episode of the TVB drama Brother's Keeper.

Around 2008, Koi Kei applied for an international trademark, which failed only in Mainland China because there was another food company in Macau that applied for the "Koi Kei" trademark ahead of Koi Kei Bakery. As the Koi Kei trademark had already been registered in all other countries, the Mainland China trademark holder found it difficult to compete with Koi Kei Bakery. Koi Kei ultimately spent over 1,000,000 to acquire its trademark rights in Mainland China.

References

External links 
 

Companies of Macau
1997_establishments_in_Macau